Kroppach is an Ortsgemeinde – a community belonging to a Verbandsgemeinde – in the Westerwaldkreis in Rhineland-Palatinate, Germany. The agriculturally structured residential community of Kroppach belongs to the Verbandsgemeinde of Hachenburg, a kind of collective municipality. Its seat is in the like-named town.

Geography

The community lies between Hachenburg and Altenkirchen and is described as the gateway to the Kroppach Switzerland nature and landscape conservation area.

History
In 1199, Kroppach had its first documentary mention. In 1999, this event was the subject of a celebratory publication (Festschrift). Kroppach was for a long time the seat of a tithe court and had its own court seal. In 1661, a so-called Kirchspiel-Winterschule (“parish winter school”) was established, which 70 years later, beginning in 1731, was also run the year round.

Politics

The municipal council is made up of 12 council members who were elected in a majority vote in a municipal election on 13 June 2004.

Culture and sightseeing

Parks
The local recreation area, called the Kroppacher Schweiz, or “Kroppach Switzerland”, with its many hiking paths and panoramas into the Nister Valley is a recognized nature and landscape conservation area.

Economy and infrastructure

South of the community runs Bundesstraße 414, leading from Hohenroth to Hachenburg. The nearest Autobahn interchanges are in Siegen, Wilnsdorf and Herborn on the A 45 (Dortmund–Gießen). The nearest InterCityExpress stop is the railway station at Montabaur on the Cologne-Frankfurt high-speed rail line.

References

External links
 Kroppach 

Municipalities in Rhineland-Palatinate
Westerwaldkreis